Jed Davis (born July 7, 1975 in Farmingdale, New York) is an American musician based in New York City.  He sings and plays keyboards as a solo artist and with The Hanslick Rebellion, Collider, and Skyscape.

Music career

Skyscape and early solo work 
As a high-school senior, keyboardist Davis formed the band Skyscape with singer Domenic Maltempi in 1991.  Skyscape recorded a CD, Band Of The Week, two years later.  After moving to the Albany area to attend the State University of New York at Albany, Davis performed in a solo capacity, self-releasing a demo tape titled Jed Has Too Much Free Time.  The demo's 33 songs were recorded on a 4-track cassette recorder by Davis and guitarist Alex Dubovoy in one weekend marathon.

Skyscape is still active, releasing the full-length albums Zetacarnosa in 2009 and Dr. Des Moines in 2016.

The Hanslick Rebellion 
Davis formed a new band, The Hanslick Rebellion, in 1995 with Dubovoy and bassist Mike Keaney.  Known for a live show matched in intensity only by the group's backstage in-fighting, the Rebellion self-released the live cassette the rebellion is here in 1996.  The volatile band imploded and ended in early 1997, reuniting for a tenth anniversary performance at New York's CBGB on September 22, 2005.

Davis resumed full-time duty with The Hanslick Rebellion following their 2005 reunion; to date they have released a remastered version of the rebellion is here on CD, a digital EP entitled The Deli Of Life, which spawned a successful online video for the song "You Are Boring The Shit Out Of Me",  and a second digital EP, Let's Get To The Fucking, which explores a fusion of rock and reggaeton.

In March 2017, The Hanslick Rebellion released a politically-charged single, "Who'll Apologize For This Disaster Of A Life", accompanied by an animated video created by Davis.

J-Bird Records 
After graduation from UAlbany, Davis moved to Woodhaven, Queens, and began composing in earnest across the musical spectrum, releasing two solo albums, We're All Going to Jail! (1997) and Jed Davis Wastes 8 Years of His Life for Your Listening Pleasure (1999) on Connecticut-based independent label J-Bird Records.

In 2001, J-Bird Records honored Davis with Everybody Wants to be Like Jed, a tribute album which featured cover art by Peter Bagge and performances of signature Davis tunes by an eclectic host of indie artists including Brian Dewan, Daniel Johnston, Anal Cunt, Wesley Willis, King Missile and members of Agnostic Front.

Collider and electroclash 
As programmer for the electronica/punk fusion band Collider (formed 1997), Davis was a pioneer of New York City's electroclash movement.  Collider's debut album, 1998's Blowing Shit Up, was a mash-up of samples, dance grooves, synthesizers, and rock guitars applied to traditional pop forms and themes.  The band's second album, Physics (1999), while still performed entirely on electronic instruments (including the Roland VG-8 guitar modeling system), was a step in a more traditional pop/rock direction, with samples of acoustic instruments employed throughout.

Rise And Shine 
Between 2000 and 2005, Davis composed the music and lyrics for a stage musical, Rise and Shine, with librettist Arturo Vega.  An attempt to record the musical in album form was aborted after several years of work, despite a voice cast which included Dicky Barrett, C.J. Ramone, Matthew Koma, Brian Dewan and Jessy Moss.  Following Vega's death in 2013, Davis resumed work on the recording in tribute to his friend, adding Heather Maloney, Miss Guy, and Shea Diamond to the cast.

WCYF and "The Bowery Electric" 
Moving to lower Manhattan influenced Davis's transition from electroclash toward a rawer punk sound, and to that end he began collaborating with some of New York's original punk rockers.  Collider's final release, WCYF (2003), was produced by Ramones drummer/producer Tommy Ramone.  In addition, Davis's tribute song to Joey Ramone, "The Bowery Electric", brought Tommy, Marky and C.J. Ramone, as well as Ramones producer Daniel Rey, together for a historic recording session.

"The Bowery Electric" was released as a single on Spanish label No Tomorrow (2002), and later on the Ramones compilation album The Family Tree (2008).

Post-Collider solo projects 
After Collider disbanded in 2004, Davis released a single, "With Love From America", under the band name The Congregation Of Vapors.

In July 2008, Davis recorded 14 songs for a solo album at Chicago's Electrical Audio with engineer Steve Albini.  As is customary for Albini recordings, the entire album was captured live to tape as performed by Davis and drummer Joe Abbatantuono.  This recording was released on 8-track tape in July, 2011, under the title Shoot The Piano Player.

Davis is enamored of archaic media formats.  He released the single "Yuppie Exodus From Dumbo" on cylinder record in June 2010.  The limited edition of 50 copies was signed and numbered by Davis and Michael Doret, who designed the packaging.

A number of Davis' finished but unreleased recordings from the Collider era, executive-produced by Dave Fridmann and mixed by Tony Doogan, were compiled and released in 2010 as The Cutting Room Floor.  Psychedelic artist Victor Moscoso provided vibrating color cover art.

In July, 2012, Davis released the full-length album Small Sacrifices Must Be Made! on Eschatone Records.  Davis' band for the album consists of guitarist Reeves Gabrels, drummer Anton Fig and bassist Graham Maby.

Jeebus 
Davis began working with a new band, Jeebus, in 2009. Jeebus includes members of both Collider and the Hanslick Rebellion, plus Reeves Gabrels.  The band toured through the American South and Midwest in the summer of 2009, and recorded a 10-song album, Jesus Christ's Supercar, was released to streaming services in 2020.

Session work 
As a session keyboardist, Davis has performed and recorded with musical acts of all genres, including Juliana Hatfield, Jessica Simpson, Hand Habits, The Deuce Project, and Matthew Koma's Bandcamp.

Eschatone Records 
Davis is co-founder of the independent folk-punk record label Eschatone Records, which is home to Brian Dewan, Michael Bassett, The Visitors and wax.on wax.off, and has also released material by Hand Habits, Jobriath, Peg, The Valley Arena, and some of Davis' projects.

In his role at Eschatone, Davis signed Daddy Long Legs (musician Brian Hurd, who debuted with The Visitors on Eschatone in 2007) and Hand Habits to their first record contracts, and oversaw the compilation of previously-unreleased Jobriath material into the full-length album As The River Flows (2014).

Discography

Solo 
 Jed Has Too Much Free Time (cassette, 1994)
 We're All Going to Jail! (CD, J-Bird, 1997)
 Jed Davis Wastes 8 Years of His Life for Your Listening Pleasure (CD, J-Bird, 1999)
 In the Presence of Presents 2003 (digital-only, 2003)
 In the Presence of Presents 2006 (digital-only, 2006)
 I Am Jed Davis! (CD, Eschatone, 2009)
 "Yuppie Exodus from Dumbo" (single, cylinder record, Eschatone, 2010)
 Celebration Party! (digital-only, Eschatone, 2010)
 The Cutting Room Floor (CD/vinyl, Eschatone, 2010)
 Shoot the Piano Player (8-track, Eschatone, 2011)
 Live at CB's Gallery (digital-only, Eschatone, 2011)
 Small Sacrifices Must Be Made! (CD/vinyl, Eschatone, 2012)
 In the Presence of Presents 2017 (digital-only, Eschatone, 2017)
 Rise and Shine: Day 1 (digital-only, Eschatone, 2019)
 Rise and Shine: Day 2 (digital-only, Eschatone, 2019)

Skyscape 
 Band of the Week (CD/cassette, Low-Sodium, 1993)
 Zetacarnosa (digital-only, Eschatone, 2009)
 Dr. Des Moines (digital-only, Eschatone, 2016)

The Hanslick Rebellion 
 The Rebellion Is Here. (cassette, 1995)
 The Rebellion Is Here. (reissue, CD, Eschatone, 2005)
 The Deli of Life (CD, Eschatone, 2007)
 Let's Get to the Fucking (digital-only, Eschatone, 2008)
 The Rebellion Was Here. (digital-only, Eschatone, 2015)

Collider 
 Blowing Shit Up (CD, Eschatonality, 1998)
 Physics (CD, Eschatonality/MP3.com, 1999)
 Amateur Hour: A Global Tribute to Sparks compilation, performing "I Predict" and "Something for the Girl with Everything" (CD, Fan Mael, 1999)
 WCYF (CD, SonaBLAST!, 2003)
 Todos Somos Ramones compilation, performing "I Can't Make It on Time" (CD, Rockaway, 2005)

The Congregation of Vapors 
 "With Love from America" (single, CD, Eschatone, 2004)

Jeebus 
 Jesus Christ's Supercar (digital-only, Eschatone, 2020)

Sevendys 
 "City of My Dreams"/"I Hate Love" (single, digital-only, Eschatone, 2011)
 "So So Close"/"When I Step Off the Train" (single, 7" vinyl, JAXART, 2011)
 "Enjoy It" (single, digital-only, 2011)
 "Please Don't Eat Me I Love You" (single, digital-only, 2011)
 "Hold On to Your Soul" (single, digital-only, 2011)
 "Duck and Cover" (single, digital-only, 2011)
 "Living in a Frame" (split-10" vinyl EP b/w Jobriath, "Amazing Dope Tales", 2013)

Other appearances 
 Bandcamp, Wanna Dance?, keyboards (CD, EVLA, 2005)
 Black Queen Speaks, Campeador, keyboards (2011)
 The Bowery Electric Crew, "The Bowery Electric", keyboards/vocals (single, 7" vinyl/CD, No Tomorrow, 2002)
 Ramones, The Family Tree, keyboards/vocals (CD, Rockaway, 2008)
 Jessica Simpson, The Apprentice - The Complete First Season, keyboards (DVD, NBC, 2004)
 Sunday Girl, Sunday Girl, keyboards/vocals/producer (2004)
 TOE, TOE, keyboards (CD, J-Bird, 1999)
 The Visitors, The Visitors, piano/organ (CD, Eschatone, 2007)
 Hand Habits, Small Shifts, keyboards/engineer/mixing (10" vinyl, Eschatone, 2013)
 Avi Buffalo, At Best Cuckold, keyboards/string arrangement (CD/vinyl, Sub Pop, 2014)
 David Schulman, Gone to Shame, keyboards/vocals/engineer/producer (2016)
 Juliana Hatfield, "Christmas Cactus/Red Poinsettia", keyboards/co-producer (single, 7" vinyl, American Laundromat, 2020)
 Juliana Hatfield, Blood, keyboards/co-producer (CD/vinyl/cassette, American Laundromat, 2021)

References

External links 
Jed Davis official Web site
Jed Davis artist page at Eschatone Records
"You Are Boring The Shit Out Of Me" music video
[ Jed Davis biography at allmusic.com]

1975 births
Living people
Songwriters from New York (state)
21st-century American keyboardists
21st-century American singers
21st-century American male singers
American male songwriters